And No More Shall We Part is a play by the Australian playwright Tom Holloway.

Plot
The play is about Pam and Don; after a long and successful marriage, they are still very much in love. But Pam is ill and has to make a heartbreaking decision that will transform both their lives. She does so in the only way she knows how – quickly, pragmatically, and resolutely. Don behaves in the only way he knows how – struggling to keep up but desperate not to lose touch.

And No More Shall We Part follows Pam and Don’s halting, humorous and devastating attempt at the impossible – to begin to say goodbye to each other after a lifetime together.

First production
And No More Shall We Part was first produced by A Bit Of Argy Bargy and Full Tilt for the Melbourne Fringe Festival at BlackBox Theatre, The Arts Centre, Melbourne, on 30 September 2009, with the following cast:

PAM:	Margaret Mills

DON:	Dennis Moore

Director: Martin White

Designer: Katie Skillington

Lighting Designers: Adam Hardy and Kimberly Anne Kwa

Production Manager: Erica McCalman

References

Australian plays
2009 plays